Emil Friedrich Knoblauch (2 December 1864, Groß Karnitten in Kreis Mohrungen – 10 February 1936) was a German botanist.

He studied at the University of Königsberg, obtaining his PhD in 1888. Later, he was associated with the botanical garden and museum in Göttingen.

He identified numerous species within the family Oleaceae, and was the taxonomic authority of the genera Leuranthus and Noldeanthus.

Published works 
He was editor of the sections on Oleaceae and Salvadoraceae in Engler and Prantl's Die Natürlichen Pflanzenfamilien. In Eugenius Warming's Handbuch der systematischen botanik (A handbook of systematic botany), he authored a revision of the "Fungi" section(s). Other noteworthy written efforts by Knoblauch include:
 Anatomie des holzes der laurineen, 1888 - Anatomy involving the wood of Laurineae.
 Ökologische Anatomie der Holzpflanzen der südafrikanischen immergrünen Buschregion, 1896 - Ecological anatomy of woody plants of the South African evergreen bush region.

References 

1864 births
1936 deaths
19th-century German botanists
People from Ostróda County
University of Königsberg alumni
20th-century German botanists